Sean Russell may refer to:

Seán Russell (1893–1940), Irish republican
Sean Russell (author) (born 1952), Canadian author of fantasy literature and historical novels
Sean Russell (rugby league), Australian rugby league player